The Molnița is a left tributary of the river Siret in Ukraine and Romania. Its source is located near the village Stanivtsi, Chernivtsi Oblast, Ukraine. The river crosses the border into Romania, and discharges into the Siret near Talpa.

References

Rivers of Romania
Rivers of Botoșani County
Rivers of Chernivtsi Oblast